William H. Smith (1847 – October 5, 1877) was a Private in the United States Army who received the Medal of Honor for gallantry in action at Chiricahua Mountains, Arizona Territory on October 20, 1869, during the Indian Wars.

Biography
Smith was born in 1847 in Lapeer County, Michigan, and joined the Army in 1869. He died at Camp Howard, Idaho Territory on 5 October 1877. 

He should not be confused with William Smith, who was also awarded the Medal of Honor for gallantry in action in the same location on the same day.

Medal of Honor citation
Rank and organization: Private, Company G, 1st Cavalry Regiment. Place and date: At Chiricahua Mountains, Ariz., October 20, 1869. Entered service at: ------. Birth: Lapeer County, Mich. Date of issue: February 14, 1870. 

Citation:

Gallantry in action.

See also

List of Medal of Honor recipients for the Indian Wars

References

American people of the Indian Wars
United States Army Medal of Honor recipients
People from Lapeer County, Michigan
United States Army soldiers
American Indian Wars recipients of the Medal of Honor
1847 births

1877 deaths